Yakub Idrizov (born 22 November 1990) is a Bulgarian football player who plays as a midfielder.

Career
Yakub Idrizov has started his football career in the youth team of Sliven 2000. After numerous games as a captain of Sliven 2000 in the Youth Bulgarian league, he joined the first team which at that time was playing in the First professional league (known as A PFG). He also played for the teams of Nesebar and Vereya. On 19th of January 2016 Idrizov joined the Bulgarian B PFG team Sozopol, after he was released from Vereya where he played for 3 years. Idrizov left Sozopol in June 2017.

In July 2017, Idrizov joined Lokomotiv Gorna Oryahovitsa.  He left the club at the end of the 2017–18 season.

On 25 June 2018, Idrizov signed with Third League club Hebar.

References

External links 
 Guardian's Stats Centre
 

Living people
1993 births
Sportspeople from Sliven
Bulgarian footballers
Association football midfielders
OFC Sliven 2000 players
PFC Nesebar players
FC Vereya players
FC Sozopol players
FC Lokomotiv Gorna Oryahovitsa players
FC Hebar Pazardzhik players
FC Pomorie players
PFC Dobrudzha Dobrich players
First Professional Football League (Bulgaria) players
Second Professional Football League (Bulgaria) players